Triplasiella is a genus of flowering plants belonging to the family Poaceae.

Its native range is Southern USA to Mexico, Cuba, Venezuela.

Species:
 Triplasiella eragrostoides (Vasey & Scribn.) P.M.Peterson & Romasch.

References

Poaceae
Poaceae genera